Stian Tomt Thoresen (born 18 November 1976), known professionally as Shagrath, is a Norwegian musician who is the vocalist, founding member and multi-instrumentalist of the band Dimmu Borgir.

Biography
Stian Thoresen was born on 18 November 1976 in Jessheim. He is a founding member, with Silenoz and Tjodalv, of Dimmu Borgir. When the band formed in 1993, Shagrath played drums, but switched to vocals before the release of the album Stormblåst in 1996. He has also played keyboards, guitar, and bass guitar. Shagrath played guitar in Fimbulwinter until the band split up in 1992. Fimbulwinter released one album, Servants of Sorcery, through Hot Records (Shagrath's record label) in 1994. Shagrath is the rhythm guitarist/songwriter and founding member of the hard rock band Chrome Division, which formed in 2004.

In late 2009, Shagrath and King ov Hell formed the black metal supergroup Ov Hell. In February 2010 the band released an album entitled The Underworld Regime. Shagrath has also played guest keyboards in the black metal band Ragnarok, and had a solo project named Starkness.

Stage name
Shagrath has said this about his stage name: "Shagrath is an orc demon from the book Lord of the Rings. I chose the name thirteen years ago, so it's kinda crappy that Lord of the Rings has become so big now. Fortunately it [the name] didn't get that much attention in the movie, so it turned out all OK." The Tolkien character Shagrat, an orc commander over Cirith Ungol, is however not a demon in Tolkien lore.

Discography

With Dimmu Borgir
Inn i evighetens mørke (1994)
For all tid (1995)
Stormblåst (1996)
Devil's Path (1996)
Enthrone Darkness Triumphant (1997)
Godless Savage Garden (1998)
Sons of Satan Gather for Attack (split EP with Old Man's Child) (1999)
Spiritual Black Dimensions (1999)
True Kings of Norway (2000) (split with Emperor, Immortal, Ancient, and Arcturus) (1998)
Puritanical Euphoric Misanthropia (2001)
Alive in Torment (2001)
World Misanthropy (2002)
Death Cult Armageddon (2003)
Stormblåst MMV (2005)
In Sorte Diaboli (2007)
The Invaluable Darkness (2008)
Abrahadabra (2010)
Eonian (2018)

With Chrome Division
Doomsday Rock 'n Roll (2006)
Booze, Broads and Beelzebub (2008)
3rd Round Knockout (2011)
Infernal Rock Eternal (2014)
One Last Ride (2018)

With Starkness
Unto The Darkly Shining World (single) (1996) (Solo Project )

With Ragnarok
Arising Realm (1997) (Guest Keyboards )

With Ov Hell
The Underworld Regime (2010)

With Fimbulwinter
Servants of Sorcery (1994)

As a guest vocalist
Astarte – Sirens (2004, song "The Ring of Sorrow")
Diaz – Velkommen Hjem Andres (2004, song "Mitt Terningkast")
Destruction – Inventor of Evil (2005, song "The Alliance of Hellhoundz")
Kamelot – The Black Halo (2005, songs "March of Mephisto" and "Memento Mori")
Susperia – Attitude (2009, song "Sick Bastard")
Old Man's Child –  Slaves of the World (2009, Born of the Flickering remake)
Crossplane – Class of Hellhound high (2013) song : I will be King
The Carburetors – Laughing in the face of death (2015) song : Lords Of Thunder

References

1970 births
Living people
Black metal singers
Dimmu Borgir members
Norwegian heavy metal bass guitarists
Norwegian male bass guitarists
Heavy metal keyboardists
Norwegian black metal musicians
Norwegian heavy metal drummers
Male drummers
Norwegian heavy metal guitarists
Norwegian male singers
Norwegian multi-instrumentalists
Norwegian rock bass guitarists
Norwegian rock guitarists
Norwegian rock keyboardists
Norwegian rock singers
People from Jessheim
Musicians from Oslo
Rhythm guitarists
21st-century Norwegian drummers
21st-century Norwegian bass guitarists
Chrome Division members